Aguada de Moya is a small town and ward (“consejo popular”) in Camajuaní, Villa Clara, Cuba. The nearby towns are Chorrerón, San Antonio de las Vueltas, La Quinta, La Luz, Vega Alta, Pavón, Puente Pavón, El Rufugio, and Loma de Mujico.

History 
Aguada de Moya used to be a part of San Antonio de las Vueltas Municipality until 1976.

Geography 
The ward of Aguada de Moya includes the towns and hamlets of:

 Aguada de Moya
 El Purial
 Chorrerón
 Ojo de Agua
 Guajén
 Mochita
 Dolorita
 CPA Juan B. Montes de Oca
 CPA Fructuoso Rodríguez

Education 
Schools in Aguada de Moya include: 

 Isidro Glez Primary (Chorrerón)
 Celestino Pacheco Primary (El Purial)

Economy
According at the DMPF of Camajuani, Aguada de Moya is a settlement linked to sources of employment or economic development. 

The Provincial Tobacco Company La Estrella has territory in La Quinta, Camajuani, Aguada de Moya, San Antonio de las Vueltas, and Taguayabón.

Government 
Camajuaní has multiple Constituency Delegate (Delegado Circunscripción) for every ward, Aguada de Moya’s ward has: 

 Constituency Delegate #33 Yusbyela Peña Orozco
 Constituency Delegate #40 Lázaro González Marrero (of Guajén) 
 Constituency Delegate #47 Elkis Emilio Muros
 Constituency Delegate #49 Hildelisa Montero Hernández
 Constituency Delegate #50 Armando León Orozco
 Constituency Delegate #56 Mildrey Ramos Peña

See also 
 Santa Clara, Cuba
 Canoa, Cuba
 Luis Arcos Bergnes, Cuba

References 

Populated places in Villa Clara Province
Villa Clara Province
Populated places established in 1793
1793 establishments in North America
1793 establishments in Cuba
1793 establishments in the Spanish Empire